The 2007–08 Davidson Wildcats men's basketball team represented Davidson College in NCAA men's Division I competition during the 2007–08 NCAA Division I men's basketball season. Coached by 2008 NABC Coach of the Year Bob McKillop and led by consensus Second Team All-American guard Stephen Curry, the Wildcats completed an undefeated season in the Southern Conference, and reached the 2008 NCAA Division I men's basketball tournament Elite 8, upsetting Gonzaga, Georgetown, and Wisconsin before finally falling to eventual national champion Kansas by a score of 59–57. This marked the first time that Davidson had won a tournament game since the 1969 season, when the Wildcats had reached the Elite Eight under then-coach Lefty Driesell.

Roster

Schedule and results

|-
!colspan=9 style=| Regular season
|-

|-
!colspan=9 style=| SoCon Tournament
|-

|-
!colspan=9 style=| NCAA Tournament
|-

Rankings

Awards and honors
Stephen Curry – Consensus Second-team All-American, SoCon Player of the Year
Jason Richards – National assists leader
Bob McKillop – NABC Coach of the Year, Clair Bee Coach of the Year Award, SoCon Coach of the Year

References

Davidson Wildcats men's basketball seasons
Davidson
Southern Conference men's basketball champion seasons
Davidson Wildcats men's b
Davidson Wildcats men's b
Davidson